The following lists events that happened during 1809 in Australia.

Incumbents
Monarch - George III

Events
25 April – First post office in Sydney established. Ex-convict Isaac Nichols is the first postmaster.
8 May – Lachlan Macquarie is officially appointed Governor of New South Wales, caretaker William Patterson governs until his appointment begins on 1 January 1810.
24 May – Lachlan Macquarie receives his commission as next governor of New South Wales, including instructions to reinstate Bligh temporarily on his arrival.

Exploration and settlement
Settlement began at O'Brien's bridge near the centre of present-day Glenorchy, Tasmania.

Births
5 April – Arthur Edward Kennedy, Governor of Western Australia 1855-62 and Governor of Queensland 1877-1883

References

 
Australia
Years of the 19th century in Australia